Eight ships of the Royal Netherlands Navy have been named HNLMS Van Speijk (also spelled Speyk), after Jan van Speijk:

 , ex Argo, corvette;
 , ex Medusa, corvette;
 , an  unprotected cruiser
 , shore bombardment/escort ship;
 , auxiliary ship (ex Flores);
 , was the lead ship of her class of frigates.
 , experimental ship for testing with new fuel.

References

Royal Netherlands Navy ship names